The Ratapani Tiger Reserve, located in the Raisen district of Madhya Pradesh, in Vindhya Range in central India, is one of the finest teak forests in the state and is less than  away from the capital Bhopal.

It has been a wildlife sanctuary since 1976. , in-principle approval by the National Tiger Conservation Authority (NTCA) has been granted for upgrading it to a status of tiger reserve. It will become a tiger reserve by the notification of the Government of Madhya Pradesh. Its close proximity to the capital and its relatively untouched forests makes it a promising attraction for tourists and the Madhya Pradesh tourism board plans to make it a wildlife destination in the near future. The reserve is rich in flora and fauna and a wide variety of birds and mammals call it their home. 

A number of seasonal streams irrigate the site in the monsoon, and water is retained in some pools along these streams even in the summer. Two large reservoirs, namely Barna Reservoir and Ratapani Dam (Barrusot lake) are among the major waterbodies adjacent to or inside the sanctuary. The forest of Ratapani is dry deciduous and moist deciduous type, with teak (Tectona grandis) as the main tree species. About 55% of the area is covered by teak. The remaining mixed forests consist of various dry deciduous species. Bamboo (Dendrocalamus strictus) overlaps the two aforementioned forest types and covers about one quarter of the forest area. Bhimbetka rock shelters, are located within this tiger reserve. These rock shelters were inhabited by man hundreds of thousand years ago and some of the rock paintings of the Stone Age are more than 30,000 years old. It has been declared a World Heritage Site by UNESCO. The tourist places include Bhimbetka, Delawari, Ginnorhgarh Fort, Ratapani Dam, KairiMahadeo and Kherbana Mandir.

Tiger reserve status
As per the government, in-principle approval has been accorded by the National Tiger Conservation Authority for creation of two new tiger reserves, and the sites are: Ratapani (Madhya Pradesh) and Sunabeda (Odisha). Final approval has been accorded to Kudremukh (Karnataka) and Rajaji (Uttarakhand) for declaring as a tiger reserve. The state governments have been advised to send proposals for declaring the following areas as tiger reserves: (i) Suhelwa Wildlife Sanctuary (Uttar Pradesh), (ii) Guru Ghasidas National Park (Chhattisgarh), (iii) Mhadei Wildlife Sanctuary (Goa), (iv) Srivilliputhur Grizzled Giant Squirrel / Megamalai Wildlife Sanctuaries / Varushanadu Valley (Tamil Nadu) and (v) Dibang Wildlife Sanctuary (Arunachal Pradesh).

Wildlife
A large variety of wildlife is found in the wildlife sanctuary. Some precipitous hills have cliffs; have large rock blocks and talus at the base. This unique feature provides shelter to various animals like vultures, reptiles and small mammals.

Carnivores in the sanctuary include the tiger, leopard, dhole, hyena, jackal and fox, and the herbivores include chital, sambar, nilgai, four-horned antelope, langur and wild boar, and primates: langur and rhesus macaque. The omnivorous sloth bear is also seen often. Smaller animals, like squirrels, mongooses, gerbils, porcupines, hares, etc. are of common occurrence. Among reptiles, important species include different kinds of lizards, chameleon, snakes, etc. Among snakes, cobra, python, viper, krait, etc. are common. More than 150 species of birds are seen here. A few to mention are the common babbler, crimson-breasted barbet, bulbul, bee-eater, baya, cuckoo, kingfisher, kite, lark, Bengal vulture, sunbird, white wagtail, crow pheasant, jungle crow, egrets, myna, jungle fowl, parakeets, partridges, hoopoe, quails, woodpeckers, blue jay, dove, black drongo, flycatcher, flower pecker and rock pigeon.

In February 2019, a tiger found in the area of Lunavada in Mahisagar district of Gujarat State, before being spotted dead, was said to have come from this sanctuary.

Avifauna

The Ratapani WLS is rich in the typical wildlife of central India. Not much work has been done on the birds of Ratapani, although
frequent visits by birdwatchers to the site provide baseline information on the species seen in and around the site. More than 150 species of birds are reported from Ratapani Wildlife Sanctuary(K. Sharma pers. comm. 2003).

Oriental white-backed vulture (Gyps bengalensis), long-billed vulture (Gyps indicus) and red-headed vulture (Sarcogyps calvus) are often found perched on a cluster of trees or soaring at great heights in search of food (K. Sharma pers. comm. 2002). The Ratapani dam at the periphery of the sanctuary invites thousands of migratory birds in winter. There are many smaller reservoirs dotted all over the sanctuary. The total waterfowl populations in all these smaller reservoirs and Ratapani reservoir would easily exceed 20,000 (A4iii criteria). Moreover, these waterbodies also attract large wading birds such as the sarus crane (Grus antigone), painted stork (Mycteria leucocephala), black-necked stork (Ephippiorhynchus asiaticus) and white-necked stork (Ciconia episcopus) (K. Sharma pers. comm. 2002). The rich diversity in terrestrial species throughout the sanctuary calls for a proper bird survey of the area.

Ratapani retains some of the finest representative forest cover of the Indo-Malayan Tropical Dry Zone (Biome-11). Of the 59 bird
species identified by BirdLife International (undated) in this biome, 33 are found in Ratapani, further proving the importance of this site for the protection of biome species. Detailed studies could reveal more bird species.

Threats And Conservation Issues
 Poaching
 Encroachment and forest fires
 Illicit felling
 Livestock grazing
 Man-animal conflict

This large sanctuary faces pressures from all directions. Illicit felling, grazing by cattle, poaching and encroachment are the major concerns for the management. Presence of 26 villages inside the sanctuary and another 109 villages around it exert the associated anthropogenic pressures. These villages are dependent for their day-to-day needs on the biomass resources of the sanctuary. Forest fires, natural and man-made, are a major problem in summer. The long, narrow area of Ratapani WLS(about 70 km long and about 15 km wide) makes it more vulnerable to intensive biotic pressure in most of its areas.

References

Tiger reserves of India
Wildlife sanctuaries in Madhya Pradesh
Tourist attractions in Raisen district
Protected areas established in 1976
1976 establishments in Madhya Pradesh